The 2017 King Cup, or The Custodian of the Two Holy Mosques Cup, was the 42nd edition of the King Cup since its establishment in 1957, and the 10th under the current format. It started on 18 January and concluded with the final on 18 May 2017. The winner qualifies for the 2018 AFC Champions League group stage.

Al-Hilal won their eighth title after a 3–2 win over defending champions Al-Ahli in the final on 18 May 2017.

The winner of the King Cup earns automatic qualification to the 2018 AFC Champions League group stage. However, as Al-Hilal qualified for the AFC Champions League via winning the league, Al-Nassr, the highest placed team in the 2016–17 Saudi Professional League not already qualified took the group stage spot.

Participating teams
A total of 32 teams participated in this season. 14 teams from the Professional league, 15 teams from the First Division, and 3 teams qualifying from the preliminary stage. Al-Hazem were excluded from participating this season after they withdrew from the competition last year.

Bracket

Note:     H: Home team,   A: Away team

source: SAFF

Round of 32
The Round of 32 matches were played between 18 and 21 January 2017. All times are local, AST (UTC+3).

Round of 16
The Round of 16 matches were played between 23 January and 25 February 2017. All times are local, AST (UTC+3).

Quarter-finals
The Quarter-finals matches were played between 30 March and 2 April 2017. All times are local, AST (UTC+3).

Semi-finals
The four winners of the quarter-finals progressed to the semi-finals. The semi-finals were played on 12 and 13 May 2017. All times are local, AST (UTC+3).

Final

The final was played on Thursday 18 May 2017 at King Abdullah Sports City.

Top goalscorers
As of 18 May 2017

Note: Players and teams marked in bold are still active in the competition.

References

2017
King Cup
Saudi Arabia